Achabeti fortess  is an old fortress in Georgia, Gori Municipality, in the village of . The fortress is situated along the right bank of the river Liakhvi.

History 
Little is known about  Achabeti. Today the villages of Zemo Achabeti and Kvemo Achabeti lie in the Tskhinvali region. According to Georgian sources, in the late feudal epoch, a ″palace and fortress of kings″ here gave its name to the entire valley. In 1744 near Achabeti Erekle II defeated Givi Amilakhvari and the Turkish army. Achabeti is associated with the Anchabadze family; the name ″Achabeti″ means “place where the Anchabadzes lived”. A new feudal branch ″Machabeli″, derived from this family. 

Achabeti fortress was first mentioned in the 16th century. It was famous for its robustness.

At the first the fortress was only a tower with a small wall, but it has been rebuilt several times and became larger.

References

General references
Georgia, encyclopedia, Tbilisi, 1997. 
 Makalatia S., Liakhvi ravine, Tbilisi, 1971
 Zakaria p., Tskhinvali region, Tbilis, 1987
 Shida Kartli  T. I, little and big liakhvi ravine architectural heritage. Tbilisi. 2002.

Immovable Cultural Monuments of National Significance of Georgia
Forts in Georgia (country)